Patricio Enrique Neira Muñoz (born 18 April 1979) is a Chilean former footballer who played as a forward for clubs in Chile and Mexico.

Club career
A product of Palestino youth system, Neira played for them and Huachipato before joining Mexican side Puebla in 1999.

Back in Chile, he returned to Palestino in second half 2000. In the Chilean top division, he also played for Universidad de Concepción, Deportes Puerto Montt and Rangers de Talca.

In the Chilean second level, he played for Deportes Arica, Deportes Concepción, Santiago Morning, Deportivo Temuco and Deportes Copiapó, his last club.

International career
Neira represented Chile at under-20 level in the 1999 South American Championship, becoming the team top goalscorer with four goals.

In February of the same year, he made two appearances for the Chile senior team in friendlies against Guatemala and the United States.

Personal life
Neira works as a football agent.

In December 2022, he suffered a CVA.

References

External links
 
 

1979 births
Living people
Footballers from Santiago
Chilean footballers
Chilean expatriate footballers
Chile under-20 international footballers
Chile international footballers
Chilean Primera División players
Club Deportivo Palestino footballers
C.D. Huachipato footballers
Universidad de Concepción footballers
Puerto Montt footballers
Rangers de Talca footballers
Liga MX players
Club Puebla players
Primera B de Chile players‎
San Marcos de Arica footballers
Deportes Concepción (Chile) footballers
Santiago Morning footballers
Deportes Temuco footballers
Deportes Copiapó footballers
Chilean expatriate sportspeople in Mexico
Expatriate footballers in Mexico
Association football forwards